Beethoven or Bust, Music of Beethoven as realized by Don Dorsey on digital and other authentic period synthesizers.

Track listing
 "Rondo a Capriccio in G major Op. 129 'Rage Over a Lost Penny'"
 Mixed Bagatelles 
 "No. 6, in G major; Andante-Allegretto"
 from Eleven Bagatelles, Op. 119
 "No. 2, in G minor; Allegro"
 from Six Bagatelles, Op. 126
 "No. 7, in A-Flat major; Presto"
 from Seven Bagatelles, Op. 33
 Sonata No. 14 in C-sharp minor, Op. 27, No. 2 "Moonlight"
 "I. Adagio sostenuto"
 "II. Allegretto"
 "III. Presto agitato"
 Various Variations (from 15 "Eroica" Variations, Op. 35)
 Introduzione col Basso del Tema
 A due
 A tre
 A quattro
 Variation 1
 Variation 4
 Variation 5
 Variation 7 - Canone all'ottava
 Variation 8
 Variation 10
 Variation 11
 Variation D² - 1
 Variation D² - 2
 Variation D² - 3
 "III. Presto"
 from Sonata No. 6 In F Major, Op. 10, No. 2
 "Six Ecossaises, WoO 83 (1823)"
 "Fŭr Elise (Albumblatt) WoO 59 (1808)"
 "II. Scherzo: Allegretto vivace"
 from Sonata No. 18 In E-Flat Major, Op. 31, No. 3 ("Western")
 "Ode to Ludwig (based on Ode to Joy from Symphony No. 9 in D Minor ('Choral'), Op. 125, Mvt. 4)"

1988 albums
Don Dorsey albums
Telarc International Corporation albums